Jannat Al Ghezi is an Iraqi human right activist and the Deputy Director of Organization of Women's Freedom in Iraq. She and her organization help people caught in the Iraqi Civil War and they helped Yazidis and women of other cultures escape from the Islamic State in Iraq and the Levant despite the grave risk involved. They also help Iraqi women deal with domestic violence. Jannat was herself a survivor of domestic violence from her tribal family which believed she had dishonoured them. She is an International Women of Courage Award recipient.

After the award she visited other cities including a reception in Minnesota with fellow award winner Sister Carol.

References

Living people
Iraqi women activists
Year of birth missing (living people)
Iraqi human rights activists
Courage awards
Recipients of the International Women of Courage Award